Ravenwood may refer to:

 Ravenwood, a neighborhood in Langford, British Columbia
 Ravenwood, Missouri
 Ravenwood High School, a high school in Brentwood, Tennessee
 Ravenwood Plantation, a historic rice plantation in Colleton County, South Carolina
 Ravenwood, a fictional private military company owned by Jennings & Rall in the TV series Jericho
 Ravenwood Fair, a Facebook game 
 "Ravenwood, Stepson of Mystery", a short-lived occult detective series by Frederick C. Davis that ran in Secret Agent X pulp magazine.
 Marion Ravenwood, a fictional character in the 1981 film Raiders of the Lost Ark

See also
 Ravenswood (disambiguation)